Opolzneve is a village in the Yalta Municipality of the Autonomous Republic of Crimea, a territory recognized by a majority of countries as part of Ukraine and annexed by Russia as the Republic of Crimea. Its population was 417 in the 2001 Ukrainian census. Current population:

References

External links
 

Villages in Crimea
Yalta Municipality